Abha Football Club is a professional Saudi Arabian association football club based in Abha that is currently playing in the Saudi Professional League, the highest tier of Saudi football. Their home stadium is Prince Sultan bin Abdul Aziz Stadium.

They were first promoted to the top flight in 2005 when they finished as runners up in the First Division. However, they were relegated after just one season. They achieved their second promotion in 2008 when they also finished as runners up. During the 2018–19 season Abha won their first First Division title as well as promotion to the Pro League for the third in the club's history. Abha have won the Saudi Third Division once, during the 1998–99 season and the Saudi Second Division once, during the 1999–2000 season.

The club play their home games at Prince Sultan bin Abdul Aziz Stadium (also known as Al-Mahalah) in Abha. They share the stadium with rivals Damac, with whom they contest the Asir derby.

History
The idea of establishing a sports club in Abha started with the personal initiative of Abdullah Al-Muallami in 1947. His reasons for establishing a sports club was so that the youth of Abha had a place to practice and play football. The youth of Abha continued practicing without an official sports club until the year of 1960. Then the idea of establishing a sports club was put in motion. The aim of establishing a sports club wasn't only a sport-related one; it was also aimed to be an educational and sociable club. A meeting was held on this topic, and the attendees agreed to establish a sports club in Abha. However, a problem arose in the meeting which caused a split between the attendees. The cause of the split was the naming of the club. One half wanted the club's name to be Al-Ahli Club in Asir the other half wanted the name to be Ittihad Shabab Asir. An agreement was not reached and eventually, two clubs were established in Abha. And in the year 1966, the club was officially registered with the GSA under the name of Al-Farouk Sports Club in Abha. The club's first official president was Mohammed bin Ibrahim Al-Nuaami who changed the club's name from Al-Ahli Sports Club to Al-Farouk Sports Club.

During the same time, Al-Ittihad Sports Club in Abha was formed and the first official president was Aziz bin Mustafa. Under directives from the GSA, Al-Ittihad Sports Club changed their name to Abha Sports Club in 1962. This was due to a club already named Al-Ittihad Sports Club in Jeddah. And in the year of 1968, Abha Sports Club once again changed their name but this time to Al-Siddiq Sports Club, in commemoration to Abu Bakr, first of the Rashidun Caliphates. In early 1969, the GSA decided to merge both clubs, Al-Farouk and Al-Siddiq, to form one club under the name of Al-Farouk Sports Club. Sheikh Suleiman bin Ahmed Mimish was the first president of the newly merged club.

In 1972, Al-Farouk Sports Club held a ceremony in honor of Prince Khalid bin Faisal Al Saud on the occasion of his appointment as the governor of Asir. The ceremony was held at the club's headquarters and a number of matters which concern the club were discussed. One of the matters that were discussed was a name change proposed by the Prince to members of the club's board. It was unanimously agreed by members of the board and fans of the club to change the club's name to Al-Wadiea Sports Club. Al-Wadiea achieved promotion to the Saudi First Division for the first time in 1977. They spent two seasons in the First Division before being relegated to the regional leagues. In 1983, the club once again achieved promotion to the First Division and spent two seasons before being relegated at the end of the 1984–85 season. Al-Wadiea were once again promoted in 1994 before being relegated after a season. In 1999, the club changed their name from Al-Wadiea Sports Club to Abha Sports Club. That same year, the club was promoted to the Second Division under the guidance of Saad Saleh Al-Bishri as manager. A year later the club achieved promotion once again but this time to the First Division with the Algerian, Elias Bou Zaid, as manager. In 2005, Abha were promoted to the Pro League, the top tier of Saudi football, for the first time after finishing second in the 2004–05 season. The club were relegated after just a season in the top tier. Abha once again reached the Pro League after finishing second in the 2007–08 season. They were relegated after a season following their loss to Al-Raed in the relegation play-offs. Abha then spent six consecutive seasons in the Saudi First Division before getting relegated to the Second Division for the first time since 2000. On 4 May 2018, Abha defeated Al-Watani 2–1 on aggregate in the promotion play-offs to earn promotion to the second tier. On 30 April 2019, Abha were promoted to the top flight for the third time after a 2–2 draw away to Al-Nojoom. This was their second promotion in two seasons, becoming the sixth Saudi team to achieve this feat. On 11 May 2019, Abha won their first MS League title despite losing to Al-Qaisumah. The 2019–20 season was Abha's most successful season in the Pro League. They achieved their highest finish in the top flight after finishing ninth. The club also reached the semi-finals of the King Cup for the first time.

Recent seasons

Honours
Saudi First Division
Winners (8): 2018–19
Runners-up (2): 2004–05, 2007–08
Saudi Second Division
Winners (2): 1993–94, 1999–2000
Runners-up (2): 1981–82, 1982–83
Saudi Third Division
Winners (1): 1998–1999
Prince Faisal bin Fahd Cup for Division 1 and 2 Teams
Winners (1): 2003–04

Current squad 
As of 7 February 2021:

Out on loan

Managerial history

 Hassan Khairi (1971 – 1972)
 Hosni Matar (1982 – 1985)
 Wajdi Essid (1997 – 1998)
 Saad Al-Beshri (1998 – 1999)
 Elias Bou Zaid (1999 – 2000)
 Saad Al-Beshri (2000 – 2001)
 Constantin Pascal (October 11, 2001 – January 5, 2002)
 Boualem Laroum (January 5, 2002 – May 30, 2002)
 João Alves (July 1, 2002 – May 30, 2004)
 Saad Al-Beshri (August 1, 2004 – February 18, 2005)
 Yousef Al Suryati (February 18, 2005 – October 15, 2005)
 Saad Al-Beshri (October 15, 2005 – December 2, 2005)
 José Kleber (December 2, 2005 – March 24, 2006)
 Saad Al-Beshri (March 24, 2006 – April 30, 2006)
 Carlos Dante (May 24, 2006 – January 16, 2007)
 Mourad Okbi (January 21, 2007 – May 30, 2007)
 Abdelkader Youmir (August 22, 2007 – October 18, 2008)
 Saad Al-Beshri (October 18, 2008 – November 1, 2008)
 Idris Obeis (November 1, 2008 – November 22, 2009)
 Nasser Nefzi (November 18, 2009 – April 27, 2010)
 Otakar Dolejš (July 1, 2010 – October 1, 2011)
 Zuhair Al Louti (October 1, 2011 – May 28, 2012)
 Emad Soliman (May 28, 2012 – November 17, 2012)
 José Rachão (November 24, 2012 – March 23, 2013)
 Ibrahim Al-Aasmi (March 23, 2013 – June 1, 2013)
 Otakar Dolejš (July 1, 2013 – September 14, 2014)
 Riccardo De Vivo (September 26, 2014 – March 25, 2015)
 Jamal Belhadi (February 19, 2015 – March 25, 2015)
 Ibrahim Al-Aasmi (March 25, 2015 – May 1, 2015)
 Yousri bin Kahla (August 1, 2015 – November 15, 2015)
 Karim Dalhoum (November 26, 2015 – March 1, 2016)
 Lotfi El Hashmi (June 29, 2016 – January 14, 2017)
 Ibrahim Al-Aasmi (January 14, 2017 – May 1, 2017)
 Mounir Hariz (April 16, 2017 – December 18, 2017)
 Ibrahim Al-Aasmi (December 18, 2017 – January 28, 2018)
 Ahmed Mehrez (January 28, 2018 – May 10, 2018)
 Abderrazek Chebbi (June 14, 2018 – June 1, 2021)
 Martin Ševela (July 1, 2021 – June 30, 2022)
 Sven Vandenbroeck (July 16, 2022 – October 8, 2022)
 Mateusz Lajczak (caretaker) (October 8, 2022 – October 30, 2022)
 Roel Coumans (October 30, 2022 – )

Presidential history
As of 1 January 2021.

External links
 
 Abha at SPL

References

 
1966 establishments in Saudi Arabia
Association football clubs established in 1966
Football clubs in Saudi Arabia
Football clubs in Abha